ent-Pimara-9(11),15-diene synthase (EC 4.2.3.31, PMD synthase) is an enzyme with systematic name ent-copalyl-diphosphate diphosphate-lyase (ent-pimara-9(11),15-diene-forming). This enzyme catalyses the following chemical reaction

 ent-copalyl diphosphate  ent-pimara-9(11),15-diene + diphosphate

This enzyme is involved in the biosynthesis of the diterpenoid viguiepinol and requires Mg2+, Co2+, Zn2+ or Ni2+ for activity.

References

External links 
 

EC 4.2.3